Lisy Nos, was a railway station in Lisy Nos, Saint Petersburg, Russia. The station was on a wooden landing stage on the bank of the Gulf of Finland. Near the station, there was a wooden building forming the ancient orthodox church of Saint Alexander Nevsky.

The station opened on October 31, 1894, when it was constructed on a branch line from Razdelnaya station.

A steam locomotive with two or three carriages brought passengers along the branch line from Razdelnaya station. A passenger ferry from Lisy Nos to Kronstadt connected with the trains.

The old Lisy Nos station was closed in 1928 and the Razdelnaya station was renamed as "Lisy Nos".

References 

Railway stations opened in 1894
Railway stations closed in 1928
Landing stages of Russian coast in Gulf of Finland